Graeme Carr (born 28 October 1978) is an English former professional footballer. He played eleven matches for Scarborough in the Football League Third Division in the 1998–99 season.

External links

1978 births
Living people
English footballers
Association football defenders
Scarborough F.C. players
English Football League players
Workington A.F.C. players